JSC Kalinin Machine-Building Plant, ZiK or MZiK for short is a Russian industrial business, now part of Almaz-Antey holding.

History
Founded in 1866 in St. Petersburg by a decree of Russian emperor Alexander II as an artillery workshop, it was later enlarged into a state factory of field and later on anti-aircraft artillery.

In 1918 the factory was moved into Moscow Region, in 1941 to Yekaterinburg (former Sverdlovsk), where it's located up to now.

During World War II, the factory produced 20,000 anti-aircraft guns, last channel artillery unit under mass production was the 152mm KM-52.

Since the end of the 1950s, the factory is specializing on the mass production anti-aircraft rocket systems (SAM defence).

Civil products include diesel  and electrical  forklift trucks, public service trucks, electrocars, etc.

In 2014, Malik Gaisin was appointed the director of the plant.

References

External links
 Official website of MZiK

1866 establishments in the Russian Empire
Defence companies of the Soviet Union
Science and technology in the Soviet Union
Almaz-Antey
Manufacturing companies based in Yekaterinburg
Companies established in 1866
Russian brands
Soviet brands
Companies formerly listed on the Moscow Exchange